Ahlgren is a Swedish surname. Notable people with the surname include:

 Alexis Ahlgren (1887–1969), Swedish long-distance runner
 Anders Ahlgren (1888–1976), Swedish Greco-Roman wrestler
 Catharina Ahlgren (1734–1800), Swedish author, poet, translator, journalist, publicist, and feminist
 Chatrine Pålsson Ahlgren (born 1947), Swedish politician
 Elisabeth Ahlgren (1925–2010), Swedish swimmer
 Ernst Ahlgren (1850–1888), Swedish author
 George Ahlgren (1928–1951), American rower
 Gertrud Ahlgren (1782–1874), Swedish cunning woman
 Martin Ahlgren, Swedish cinematographer
 Mats Ahlgren (born 1967), Swedish fencer
 Nelson Ahlgren (1909–1981), American writer
 Paco Ahlgren (born 1968), American writer, financial analyst, economist, and programmer
 Samuel Ahlgren (1764–1816), Swedish actor
 Ville Ahlgren (born 1993), Finnish ice hockey player

See also
Ahlgrens, former Swedish confectionery company
Ahlgren Vineyard, vineyard and winery in California, United States

Swedish-language surnames